Mounts Bay RFC was a Cornish rugby club formed in December 1999 and based in Penzance, England, which folded in July 2009. Initially formed as an offshoot from Penzance & Newlyn RFC, the club operated as an independent club. Mounts Bay were promoted at the end of the 2007-08 season and competed in National Division Two in the 2008-09 season.  However, the club folded in the summer of 2009 due to financial problems and withdrew from the league structure altogether.

2006-07 season
Mounts Bay had a successful year as they were promoted to the National Leagues as champions of Southwest 1 with three games to play. They also reached two cup finals; on 11 April 2007 they lost 43-7 to Redruth in the final the CRFU Cornwall Cup and on 15 April 2007, Bay made their only visit to Twickenham for the EDF Energy Intermediate Cup Final against former winners Dunstablians. They won the match 46-36.

2007-08 season
In their first season in the National Leagues, Mounts Bay finished first in National Division Three South and were again promoted, their eighth promotion in nine seasons, to play in National Division Two during the 2008-09 season. Fly-half Lee Jarvis was the league's top point scorer with 266 points. In addition to the league championship Mounts Bay also won the Cornwall Super Cup by defeating Launceston 45-17 on 24 March 2008.

2008-09 season
Mounts Bay's quick rise ended with their only relegation. It was soon followed by an AGM in July 2009 that confirmed they were to fold after the possibility of a groundshare with Redruth RFC broke down and they were left with large debts and little assets.

Season summary

Club honours
Cornwall League 2 champions: 2000-01
Cornwall 1 v Devon 1 promotion playoff winners: 2002–03
Tribute Cornwall/Devon champions: 2003-04
Powergen Junior Vase semi-finalists: 2003-04
Western Counties West champions: 2004-05
South West Division 2 West champions: 2005-06
South West Division 1 champions: 2006-07
EDF Energy Intermediate Cup winners: 2006-07
National League Division 3 South champions: 2007-08
Cornwall Super Cup winners: 2007-08

Notable former players 

 Lee Jarvis - Wales international.
 Josh Matavesi - Fiji international.

See also

Rugby union in Cornwall

Notes

References

Sport in Penzance
Cornish rugby union teams
English rugby union teams
Rugby clubs established in 1999
Defunct English rugby union teams
Cornish Pirates
1999 establishments in England
Sports clubs disestablished in 2009